Urban Myths ( is a 2022 South Korean anthology horror film, consisting of ten stories directed by debutant director Hong Won-ki, featuring Kim Do-yoon, Lee Yul-eum, Lee Young-jin and Lee Su-min. The omnibus film presents stories where horror is felt in familiar everyday life places like noise between floors, old furniture, mannequins, tunnel and social media. It was released theatrically on April 27, 2022.

Stories

Cast
 Kim Do-yoon as Gi-hoon
 Lee Yul-eum as Soo-jin
 Lee Young-jin as Eun-yeong 
 Lee Su-min as Hye-yeon
 Arin as Ji-hyeon
 Bong Jae-hyun as Young-min 
 AleXa as Se-ri
 Ju Hak-nyeon as Nu-ri
 Shownu as Jong-chan
 Lee Min-hyuk as Jae-hoon
 Lee Ho-won as Choong-jae
 Seo Ji-soo as Hyeon-joo
 Seol-ah as Ji-hye
 Exy as woman
 Jeong Won-chang as Jeong-gyoon 
 Oh Ryoong

Production
Principal photography began on April 29, 2021.

Release and reception
The film will be released in 13 countries overseas  including Japan, Thailand, and Taiwan in May 2022.

Box office
The film was released on 474 screens on April 27, 2022. It was placed at 3rd place at domestic box office on opening day.

As of May 15, it is at 13th place among all the Korean films released in the year 2022, with gross of $811,092 and 109,017 admissions.

Critical response
Kim Na-yeon of Star News writing about the format said, "[it is] eye-catching" and "the story that breaks the boundaries between reality and ghost stories is the sufficient 'virtue' of this film." She praised the performances of idols and wrote, "these actors completely erased concerns about their acting skills, and only made use of their strengths." Kim was also critical of the story as she wrote, "it seems that the 'poorness' of the story could not be filled even with the passionate performances of the actors who made use of each episode". Kim didn't appreciate the "excessive sound that appears every time before an important scene", and the transforming of "a character into a zombie or a bizarre monster" as it  "can come as an unpleasant feeling rather than a fear."

Lee Yoo-chae writing for Cine21 stated that idols appearing in the short stories and making different facial expressions is a "special gift for fans in that you can see a different side of your favorite star". Lee concluded by writing, "Overall, it is a mild-tasting horror film with less tension because it is easy to predict when something will come out." Lee further stated, "Contrary to the title, it is also unfortunate that the characteristics of the city of Seoul do not stand out."

References

External links

 
 
 

2022 films
2020s Korean-language films
2020s South Korean films
2022 horror films
South Korean horror anthology films
Films about social media
2022 directorial debut films